Limnaecia camptosema is a moth of the family Cosmopterigidae. It is known from Australia, where it has been recorded from Victoria.

References

Limnaecia
Moths described in 1897
Moths of Australia
Taxa named by Edward Meyrick